Krigia is a genus of North American flowering plants in the family Asteraceae. Plants of the genus are known generally as dwarf dandelions or dwarfdandelions.

The species vary in morphology. They are annual or perennial herbs growing from a fibrous root system or a taproot. One species has rhizomes with tubers. The plants produce a single stem or up to 50 or more, usually growing erect, reaching a few centimeters to 75 centimeters tall. Most of the leaves are basal, but some stems have leaves higher up. The blades are often linear to lance-shaped, toothed or lobed, and borne on winged petioles. The flower heads are solitary, growing at the top of the stem or on stalks from the leaf axils. They contain up to 60 yellow or orange flowers. The fruit is a hairless, ribbed cypsela, sometimes with a pappus.

Species
Krigia biflora – twoflower dwarfdandelion, orange dwarfdandelion, tall dwarfdandelion – most of eastern, central, + southwestern USA plus central Canada 
Krigia caroliniana
Krigia cespitosa – weedy dwarfdandelion, common dwarfdandelion, opposite-leaved dwarfdandelion – southeastern + south-central United States
Krigia dandelion – potato dwarfdandelion, colonial dwarfdandelion, tuber dandelion – southeastern + south-central United States
Krigia integrifolia – Allegheny Mountains
Krigia montana – mountain dwarfdandelion – southern Appalachians 
Krigia occidentalis – western dwarfdandelion – south-central USA
Krigia virginica – Virginia dwarfdandelion – eastern + south-central United States; Ontario, British Columbia
Krigia wrightii – Wright's dwarfdandelion – south-central USA

References

Asteraceae genera
Cichorieae
Flora of North America
Taxa named by Carl Ludwig Willdenow